Wangkatjungka is a large Aboriginal community located 130 km south east of Fitzroy Crossing in the Kimberley region of Western Australia, within the Shire of Derby–West Kimberley.

Native title 

The community is located within the registered Kurungal (WAD6217/98) native title claim area.

Governance 

The community is managed through its incorporated body, Kurungal Inc.

Town planning 

Wangkatjungka Layout Plan No.1 has been prepared in accordance with State Planning Policy 3.2 Aboriginal Settlements. Layout Plan No.1.

References

External links 
 Community portal
 Native Title Claimant application summary

Towns in Western Australia
Aboriginal communities in Kimberley (Western Australia)